Helio Jaguaribe de Mattos (1923-2018) was a Brazilian political scientist. He was born in Rio de Janeiro, the son of eminent geographer Francisco Jaguaribe de Mattos, and Francelina Santos Jaguaribe de Mattos. He studied law at the Pontifical Catholic University, graduating in 1946. As an academic, he specialized in the sociopolitical development of Brazil and Latin America. He taught at Harvard, Stanford, MIT, and El Colegio de Méjico. He also held a chair at the University Institute in Rio de Janeiro. He was a member of the Club of Rome. In 2005, he was elected to be the ninth occupant of Chair No. 11 at the Brazilian Academy of Letters in succession to Celso Furtado. He was received into the Academy on July 22, 2005 by academician Candido Mendes de Almeida.

References

Brazilian political scientists
People from Rio de Janeiro (city)
1923 births
2018 deaths